Iolaus schultzei, the Schultze's sapphire, is a butterfly in the family Lycaenidae. It is found in northern Cameroon. The habitat consists of dry savanna.

References

External links

Die Gross-Schmetterlinge der Erde 13: Die Afrikanischen Tagfalter. Plate XIII 67 e

Butterflies described in 1905
Iolaus (butterfly)
Endemic fauna of Cameroon
Butterflies of Africa